Le Mesnil-Simon can refer to:
 Le Mesnil-Simon, Calvados
 Le Mesnil-Simon, Eure-et-Loir